The 4th Rand Grand Prix was a motor race, run to South African Formula One-style rules, held on 9 December 1961 at Kyalami, South Africa. The race was run over 75 laps of the circuit, and was won by British driver Jim Clark, who led from start to finish in his Lotus 21.

There were no great differences between the local rules to which this race was run and the international Formula One rules, but for example sports car bodies were permitted, such as those driven by Jennings and Bosman.

Results

Bonnier was still on his warm-up lap when the race started, thus he was half a lap down at the start.

References
 "The Grand Prix Who's Who", Steve Small, 1995.
 "The Formula One Record Book", John Thompson, 1974.
 Race results at www.silhouet.com 

Rand Grand Prix
Rand Grand Prix
December 1961 sports events in Africa
1961 in South African motorsport